Qasemabad (also Romanized as Qāsemābād and Qāsimābād) is a village in Hegmataneh Rural District, in the Central District of Hamadan County, Hamadan Province, Iran. At the 2006 census, its population was 5,661, in 1,447 families.

The 14th-century author Hamdallah Mustawfi listed Qasemabad as one of the main villages in the Farivar district under Hamadan.

References 

Populated places in Hamadan County